Poranek TVN24 (English TVN24 Morning), since 2009 known as Wstajesz i Wiesz (eng. You Get Up and You Know), is a Polish morning news show broadcast on TVN24. It was first aired on 10 August 2001 and since 6 January 2007 it airs also at weekends. The programme is currently presented by Jarosław Kuźniar, who hosts it from Monday to Thursday and Marcin Żebrowski who is on air from Friday to Sunday. The news is presented every 30 minutes by Marta Kuligowska or Anna Seremak.

The team

Hosts

Current hosts 
Jarosław Kuźniar (Monday - Friday)
Marcin Żebrowski (Saturday & Sunday)

Former hosts 
Anita Werner
Jakub Porada

Guest hosts 
Piotr Jacoń
Krzysztof Górlicki
Katarzyna Werner
Michał Cholewiński
Igor Sokołowski
Marta Kuligowska

News presenters

Current news presenters 
Marta Kuligowska (Monday - Friday)
Anna Seremak (Saturday & Sunday)

Former news presenters 
Anna Kalczyńska
Aneta Dawidzińska
Krzysztof Górlicki
Katarzyna Kozłowska
Agata Tomaszewska
Beata Tadla
Katarzyna Werner

2009 Changes 

On Saturday, 24 January 2009 Poranek TVN24 has been renewed. It featured new graphics, music and cropping. Now the programme is also known as Wstajesz i Wiesz (eng. You Get Up and You Know) as it became a new slogan of the show. Since then it is called morning programme Wstajesz i Wiesz rather than Poranek TVN24. The presenter's desk has been made over and has become the most important point of the studio. The host sits at the desk during the whole show unlike before when the programme was presented from different places in the studio. The new 3D graphics are used when presenting weather forecast or the press. Since that day viewers can interact with the host by a new email address and by using the platform Contact24.

2011 Changes 

On 3 January 2011 TVN24 made some changes in the programme. Jakub Porada who had been the host from Friday to Sunday has been replaced by Marcin Żebrowski. Katarzyna Werner has become permanent news presenter from Monday to Thursday. Now she is on air with Jarosław Kuźniar. From Friday to Sunday Marcin Żebrowski is joined by Joanna Kryńska who has become the new news presenter. As a result, Marta Kuligowska and Beata Tadla have left the programme. The former has become the new host of Day Live and the latter continues to host The Facts on TVN and The Facts after The Facts at weekends as well as The Facts in the Afternoon on weekdays on TVN24.

However the team change was not the only one. The news bulletins quarter past and quarter to every hour are now read by the main host, not by the news presenter as it was before. The news presenter still presents the news every hour and on the half-hour beginning from 6:00 on weekdays and 7:00 at weekends. Jarosław Kuźniar has also announced some changes in the studio scenery in the nearest future.

On 3 October 2011 the team will change again. Katarzyna Werner will leave the programme as she will become the new hostess of Polska i świat|Poland and The World, where she will replace Dagmara Kaczmarek-Szałkow who will go on a maternity leave. Werner appeared on Poranek for the last time on 29 September. Jarosław Kuźniar will present the show from Monday to Friday. At weekends Marcin Żebrowski will be joined by Cracow reporter, Anna Seremak. On weekdays the programme will end at 10:00.

Holiday editions 
During the holidays of 2011, the show begins at 6:30 on weekdays. All editions from Monday to Sunday lasts until noon. In July 2011, Michał Cholewiński substituted for Jarosław Kuźniar who was on leave. The news was presented by various former news presenters, such as Marta Kuligowska, Beata Tadla and Krzysztof Górlicki. In June and July 2011, some editions were hosted by Katarzyna Werner.

References 

Polish television news shows
2001 Polish television series debuts
2000s Polish television series
2010s Polish television series
2020s Polish television series
TVN24 original programming